Michael Sommer is a German trade unionist.

Michael Sommer may also refer to:

Michael Sommer (runner), German runner in IAU 100 km World Championships
Mike Sommer (born 1934), American football running back

See also
Michael Summers (disambiguation)